Tammsaare is a village in Võru Parish, Võru County in southeastern Estonia. It has a population of 26 (as of 2011) and an area of 1.2 km².

Valga–Pechory railway passes the village on its southern side.

References

Villages in Võru County